Bidden is a village in Hampshire, England.

External links

Villages in Hampshire